The Enterprise was a weekly newspaper based in Snohomish County, Washington, United States. It published several editions to serve the cities of Edmonds, Lynnwood, and Mountlake Terrace, from 1958 to 2009. The newspaper was acquired by The Everett Herald in 1996, where it was merged with a Shoreline newspaper, and ceased publication in 2012.

History

The Enterprise was launched in 1958 by Barry O'Connor and Orville Danforth, former reporters for the Marysville Globe under Simeon R. Wilson III. The first edition of the newspaper was published on September 12, 1958, serving Edmonds and Lynnwood. A Mountlake Terrace edition was added in late 1958, followed by editions for northern King County communities in the 1970s that were later cancelled. In 1960, The Enterprise was sold to the Lafromboise family, who also operated The Chronicle in Centralia.

The Lafromboises also purchased the Edmonds Tribune-Review, which had been founded in 1910. The newspaper added a new edition to serve Mill Creek in the 1980s. It was sold again to The Everett Herald in 1996, where it absorbed Shoreline Week to produce a new edition. The four editions were consolidated into a single edition in 2009 and renamed to The Weekly Herald two years later. The Weekly Herald ceased publication on August 29, 2012, after failing to meet revenue expectations.

References

External links
Official website (archived version)

1958 establishments in Washington (state)
Lynnwood, Washington
Black Press newspapers
Mass media in Snohomish County, Washington
Newspapers published in Washington (state)
Publications established in 1958
Defunct newspapers published in Washington (state)